Tamás Vásáry (born 11 August 1933) is a Hungarian concert pianist and conductor.

Biography and career
Vásáry was born in Debrecen, Hungary, and made his stage debut at the age of 8, performing Mozart's Piano Concerto in D major, K.107 in the city of his birth, where he gave a solo recital the following year. He then began to concertize regularly as a child prodigy. At this time he was introduced to Ernő Dohnányi, a leading figure of musical life in Hungary, who made a unique exception by offering to accept the gifted youth as a pupil in spite of his age. Vásáry studied only a short time under his tutelage, however, as Dohnányi soon left Hungary.

He also studied with József Gát and Lajos Hernádi at the Franz Liszt Academy of Music in Budapest, and was later an assistant there to Zoltán Kodály. Aged 14, he won first prize in the Franz Liszt competition at the Academy of Music in Budapest, in 1947. He received an honorable mention at the V International Chopin Piano Competition in 1955. He left Hungary in 1956, and settled in Switzerland. He made his débuts in the major cities of the West in 1960-61. He has subsequently resided in London. He made many recordings for Deutsche Grammophon, particularly of the Romantic repertoire, especially Frédéric Chopin, Franz Liszt and Sergei Rachmaninoff.

As a conductor, Vásáry served as joint artistic director of the Northern Sinfonia from 1979 to 1982, sharing the post with Iván Fischer. With the Northern Sinfonia Vásáry recorded the Chopin piano concertos, directing from the keyboard. Vásáry was later Principal Conductor of the Bournemouth Sinfonietta, from 1989-97. Between 1993 and 2004 he was the Principal Conductor of the Hungarian Radio Symphony Orchestra. He has guest conducted many of the principal British orchestras as well as appearing regularly in the United States and elsewhere as pianist and conductor.

Recordings
Vásáry has recorded under six different labels: Supraphon, Deutsche Grammophon, Chandos Records, Academy Sound and Vision, Collins Classic and Hungaroton. He has recorded over 20 albums of the music of Liszt, Chopin, Brahms, Debussy, Rachmaninoff and Mozart with Deutsche Grammophon. In 1991, his recording of works by Liszt released by the Academy of Sound and Vision won the Grand Prize in Hungary. His recording of Dohnányi's violin concerto released by Hungaroton won the Midem Prize.

References

1933 births
Living people
Hungarian classical pianists
Jewish classical pianists
Male classical pianists
Hungarian conductors (music)
Hungarian male musicians
Male conductors (music)
Franz Liszt Academy of Music alumni
Long-Thibaud-Crespin Competition prize-winners
Honorary Members of the Royal Academy of Music
People from Debrecen
Prize-winners of the Queen Elisabeth Competition
21st-century conductors (music)